Bernard Prince  is a Franco-Belgian comics series, featuring an eponymous character and his sailor-adventurer companions. The series was created by Belgian cartoonists Greg and Hermann for the Franco-Belgian comics magazine Tintin, first appearing on January 4, 1966.

Synopsis
Originally an agent of Interpol the heroic Prince, joined by the roguish Barney Jordan and the clever orphan Djinn, becomes an adventurer sailing through the contemporary (1960s-70s) world on a sloop, the beautiful Cormoran.

Bibliography
 General Satan, story by Greg, illustrations by Hermann
 Storm over Coronado, Greg/Hermann
 The Hell of Suong-Bay, Greg/Hermann
 Manhattan Adventure, Greg/Hermann (remake illustrated by Edouard Aidans)
 Fire in the Oasis, Greg/Hermann
 The Law of the Hurricane, Greg/Hermann
 The Scorched Land, Greg/Hermann
 The Green Flame of the Conquistador, Greg/Hermann
 Guerillas for a Ghost, Greg/Hermann
 The Hot Breath of Moloch, Greg/Hermann
 Fortress of Fog, Greg/Hermann
 Target: Cormoran, Greg/Hermann
 Port of Madness, Greg/Hermann
 The Trap of 100,000 Spears, Greg/Dany
 The Cormoran Returns, Greg/Dany (includes "Farewell, Queen!" (Adieu, la reine!), "Everyone's taste" (Chacun son goût), "The return of Cormoran" (Le retour du Cormoran))
 Miss Dynamite, Greg/Aidans
 Green Poison, Greg/Aidans
 Danger on the River, Yves H./Hermann

Sources

 Bernard Prince publications in Belgian Tintin and French Tintin  BDoubliées 
 Bernard Prince albums Bedetheque 

Footnotes

Lombard Editions titles
Prince, Bernard
Belgian comic strips
Prince, Bernard
1966 comics debuts
Drama comics
Adventure comics
Action comics
Crime comics
Detective comics
Nautical comics
Prince, Bernard
Prince, Bernard
Prince, Bernard
Prince, Bernard